David Austin Starkweather (January 21, 1802 – July 12, 1876) was an American lawyer and politician who was a U.S. Representative from Ohio and a U.S. diplomat. He served two non-consecutive terms in the U.S. House of Representatives in the mid-19th century and was United States Ambassador to Chile during the presidency of Franklin Pierce.

Early life and career 
Starkweather was born in Preston, Connecticut on January 21, 1802. He graduated from Williams College and studied law with his brother in Cooperstown, New York. He was admitted to the bar in 1825, establishing a practice in Mansfield, Ohio. He located in Canton, Ohio in 1828.

Political career 
He was a judge in one of the higher courts in Stark County, Ohio.  He was a member of the Ohio House of Representatives from 1833 to 1835, and a member of the Ohio Senate from 1836 to 1838.  He was a representative of the Democrats in Congress from Ohio from 1839 to 1841 and again from 1845 to 1847. In his first term, he was a member of the Committee on Roads and Canals, and a member of the Committee on Invalid Pensions the second term. He was chosen a presidential elector in 1848 for Cass/Butler, and served as U.S. envoy to Chile from 1854 to 1857. He lost election to Ohio's 18th congressional district in 1860.

Death
Starkweather died of paralysis at the home of his daughter, Mrs. Brinsmade, in Cleveland, Ohio, July 12, 1876. He had three daughters and one son.

References

External links

 

1802 births
1876 deaths
Democratic Party members of the Ohio House of Representatives
Democratic Party Ohio state senators
19th-century American diplomats
Ambassadors of the United States to Chile
People from Preston, Connecticut
Politicians from Canton, Ohio
1848 United States presidential electors
Williams College alumni
19th-century American politicians
Democratic Party members of the United States House of Representatives from Ohio